Shurandy Reyes (born 7 October 2001) is a Sint Maartener footballer who plays for Dutch club Overmaas of the Vierde Klasse, and the Sint Maarten national team.

Club career 
As a youth Reyes played for IJVV De Zwervers. He has played for Overmaas of the Vierde Klasse since at least 2019.

International career 
Reyes was called-up for two 2019–20 CONCACAF Nations League C matches in October 2019. He was one of four Dutch-based players in the squad. He made his senior international debut on 14 October in the team's  match against Guadeloupe.

International career statistics

References

External links

Living people
2001 births
Association football forwards
Sint Maarten international footballers
Dutch Antillean footballers